Beyblade Burst QuadDrive, known in Japan as  and as Beyblade Burst DB, is a 2021 original net animation series and the sixth season of Beyblade Burst. The series was produced by ADK Emotions and animated by OLM, and it began streaming in Japan on the CoroCoro and Takara Tomy YouTube channels on April 2, 2021. An English dub of the season premiered on Disney XD and DisneyNOW in the United States on December 4, 2021. It aired in India from December 12, 2022 to December 28, 2022 on Disney Channel. The opening theme is "Clash! Dynamite Battle" by Noristry while the ending theme is an instrumental version of "Clash! Dynamite Battle". The English opening theme is "We're Your Rebels" by NateWantsToBattle while the ending theme is an instrumental version of "We're Your Rebels".


Episode list

References

Burst Season 6
2021 anime ONAs
2022 anime ONAs
2021 Japanese television seasons
2022 Japanese television seasons